Ilja Smorguner (born 24 June 1984) is a German karateka. He is a two-time medalist in the men's individual kata event at the World Karate Championships.

He represented Germany at the 2020 Summer Olympics in Tokyo, Japan. He competed in the men's kata event.

Career 

In 2017, he competed in the men's kata event at the World Games held in Wrocław, Poland. He lost his matches in the elimination round and he did not advance to compete in the semi-finals. In 2018, he lost his bronze medal match in the men's individual kata event at the World Karate Championships held in Madrid, Spain. In 2019, he lost his bronze medal match in the men's individual kata event at the 2019 European Games held in Minsk, Belarus. In that year, he also competed in the men's individual kata event at the 2019 World Beach Games held in Doha, Qatar.

In 2021, he competed at the World Olympic Qualification Tournament held in Paris, France hoping to qualify for the 2020 Summer Olympics in Tokyo, Japan. He did not qualify at this tournament but he qualified after reassignment of the last qualifying spots. He finished in 4th place in his pool in the elimination round of the men's kata event and he did not advance to the next round. In November 2021, he competed at the 2021 World Karate Championships held in Dubai, United Arab Emirates.

Achievements

References

External links 

 

Living people
1984 births
Place of birth missing (living people)
German male karateka
Competitors at the 2017 World Games
European Games competitors for Germany
Karateka at the 2019 European Games
Karateka at the 2020 Summer Olympics
Olympic karateka of Germany
21st-century German people